"(The Man Who Shot) Liberty Valance" is a song written by Burt Bacharach and Hal David, which was released by Gene Pitney in 1962. It spent 13 weeks on the Billboard Hot 100 chart, peaking at No. 4, while reaching No. 2 on Canada's CHUM Hit Parade, and No. 4 on New Zealand's "Lever Hit Parade".

Although it was not used in the film, The Man Who Shot Liberty Valance, there is disagreement about whether the song had been intended to appear in it. Nevertheless, Pitney has stated that the recording session was paid for by Paramount, and that it was midway through the effort when he found out that the song was not going to be included in the film; one of the orchestra members told him that the movie had been released.  Session drummer Gary Chester plays on the recording.

The Pitney and the Jimmie Rodgers versions of the song are noted for a solo violin that plays in the upper register. Both versions are noteworthy for the chorus, where a quick half-second strike on the tympani is heard, depicting the gun shots, which go:

"The man who shot Liberty Valance, (bong)
He shot Liberty Valance, (bong),
He was the bravest of them all".

The first verse describes the outlaw's intimidating presence and ability with a gun, the second focuses on the man who comes to town prepared to defeat Valance with the law alone. Further along we learn how the law-book toting hero falls in love with a girl who, when he is forced to confront Valance, waits alone and prays, knowing that: "When two men go and face (or "fight") each other, only one returns".

The song was ranked No. 36 in the Western Writers of America's list of the top 100 Western songs of all time, as compiled from a survey of its members.

Jimmie Rodgers released a cover similar in form to the Gene Pitney version.

The Greg Kihn Band included their take on their 1980 album Glass House Rock.
James Taylor  recorded it for his 1985 album That's Why I'm Here.

Chart performance

References

1962 songs
1962 singles
Musicor Records singles
Gene Pitney songs
Songs about fictional male characters
Songs with music by Burt Bacharach
Songs with lyrics by Hal David